The Ballon d'Alsace  (el. 1247 m.), sometimes also called the Alsatian Belchen to distinguish it from other mountains named "Belchen" is a mountain at the border of Alsace, Lorraine, and Franche-Comté. From its top, views include the Vosges, the Rhine valley, the Black Forest, and the Alps.

A road leads over a pass near the peak at the Col du Ballon d'Alsace, . The pass is noted as the site of the first official mountain climb in the Tour de France on 11 July 1905, the first rider to the top of the climb being René Pottier and the stage being won by Hippolyte Aucouturier. Stage 9 of the 2005 Tour crossed this pass on the centenary of the original climb.

Ballon d'Alsace features Alpine and Cross Country skiing tracks.

The mountain is part of the so-called Belchen System, a group of mountains with the name "Belchen" (in German) that may have been part of a Celtic sun calendar.

Geography

Climate
Ballon d'Alsace has a humid continental climate (Köppen climate classification Dfb).

Gallery

See also
Col du Ballon d'Alsace
 Souvenir Henri Desgrange

References

External links

Mountains of the Vosges
One-thousanders of France
Mountains of Vosges (department)
Mountains of Haut-Rhin
Mountains of the Territoire de Belfort
Mountains of Haute-Saône